The Azerbaijan Volleyball Federation (AVF) is the governing body of volleyball and beach volleyball in Azerbaijan. The Azerbaijan Volleyball Federation was founded in 1991, and became a member of the International Volleyball Federation (FIVB) and the European Volleyball Confederation (CEV) in 1992. The Azerbaijan Volleyball Federation's president is Javid Gurbanov. Its headquarters are located in Baku.

See also
 Azerbaijan Volleyball League
 Azerbaijan Women's Volleyball Super League

References

External links
  (Expired web domain.)

National members of the European Volleyball Confederation
Volleyball
Sports organizations established in 1991
Federation
Organizations based in Baku
1991 establishments in Azerbaijan